This is a list of buildings that are examples of the Art Deco architectural style in Pennsylvania, United States.

Erie 
 Boston Store, Erie, 1929
 Erie Armory, Erie, 1929
 Erie Federal Courthouse, Erie, 1937
 Renaissance Centre, Erie, 1925
 Union Station, Erie, 1927
 United States Post Office, Erie, 1945
 Warner Theatre, Erie, 1931

Philadelphia 
 30th Street Station, Philadelphia, 1934
 1616 Walnut Street Building, Philadelphia, 1929
 1822 Spring Garden, Philadelphia, 1930s or 1940s
 Academy at Palumbo, Queen Village, Philadelphia, 1930
 Academy for the Middle Years Northwest Middle School, Philadelphia, 1896 and 1929
 Beneficial Savings Bank, Philadelphia, 1946
 Bodine High School for International Affairs, Northern Liberties, Philadelphia, 1924
 Boyd Theatre, Philadelphia, 1928
 Central High School, Logan, Philadelphia, 1937
 Clara Barton School, Feltonville, Philadelphia, 1925
 Crown Can Company Building, Juniata, Philadelphia
 Delaplaine McDaniel School, Point Breeze, Philadelphia, 1935–1937
 Drake Hotel, Philadelphia, 1928
 Edward W. Bok Technical High School, Philadelphia, 1938
 Edwin Forrest School, Mayfair, Philadelphia, 1929
 Edwin M. Stanton School, Southwest Center City, Philadelphia, 1926
 Ethan Allen School, Mayfair, Philadelphia, 1930
 Francis Hopkinson School, Juniata, Philadelphia, 1927
 G.W. Childs Elementary School, Point Breeze, Philadelphia, 1908 and 1927
 Gen. John F. Reynolds School, Philadelphia, 1926
 George Meade School, North Central, Philadelphia, 1936
 George W. Nebinger Elementary School, Bella Vista, Philadelphia, 1925
 Hajoca Corporation Headquarters and Showroom, University City, Philadelphia, 1921 and 1930
 James J. Sullivan School, Frankford, Philadelphia, 1930
 Jim's Steaks, Philadelphia
 John Bartram High School, Southwest Philadelphia, Philadelphia, 1939
 Joseph H. Brown Elementary School, Holmesburg, Philadelphia, 1937
 Joseph W. Catharine School, Mount Moriah, Philadelphia, 1938
 Lewis Tower, Center City, Philadelphia, 1929
 Lydia Darrah School, Francisville, Philadelphia, 1927
 Market Street National Bank (now Marriott Residence Inn), Philadelphia, 1929
 Mary Channing Wister School, Poplar, Philadelphia, 1926
 Murrell Dobbins Career and Technical Education High School, North Philadelphia, Philadelphia, 1937
 National Bank of North Philadelphia, Nicetown–Tioga, Philadelphia, 1928
 Naval Hospital Philadelphia, Philadelphia, 1935
 Nix Federal Building, Philadelphia, 1941
 One South Broad, Center City, Philadelphia, 1932
 Our Lady of Loreto Church, Philadelphia, 1938
 Paul Lawrence Dunbar School, Templetown, Philadelphia, 1932
 Pennsylvania Railroad Freight Building, University City, Philadelphia, 1929
 Penypack Theatre, Holmesburg, Philadelphia, 1929
 Philadelphia Museum of Art Perelman Building Philadelphia, 1926
 Philadelphia Quartermaster Depot, Philadelphia, 1799 and 1926
 Philadelphia School of Occupational Therapy, Philadelphia, 1929
 Robert Fulton School, Morton, Philadelphia, 1937
 Roberts Vaux Junior High School, North Central, Philadelphia, 1938
 Sedgwick Theater, Mount Airy, Philadelphia, 1928
 Special Troops Armory, Ogontz, Philadelphia, 1938
 Spring Garden School, Poplar, Philadelphia, 1931
 Suburban Station, Penn Station, Philadelphia, 1934
 Sun Oil Building, Center City, Philadelphia, 1928
 Terminal Commerce Building, Callowhill, Philadelphia, 1931
 Thomas K. Finletter School, Olney, Philadelphia, 1930
 Tindley Temple United Methodist Church, Southwest Center City, Philadelphia, 1923
 United States Court House and Post Office, Philadelphia, 1930s
 United States Custom House, Philadelphia, 1934
 United States Post Office–Main Branch, Philadelphia, 1931–1935
 Uptown Theater, Philadelphia, 1927
 Vare-Washington School, Dickinson Narrows, Philadelphia, 1937
 WCAU TV Building, 1622 Chestnut Street, Philadelphia, 1928
 William M. Meredith School, Queens Village, Philadelphia, 1931
 YMCA Philadelphia, Philadelphia, 1926

Pittsburgh 
 Bell Telephone Building, Downtown Pittsburgh, Pittsburgh, 1923
 Brighton Theater (now NALC Branch), Pittsburgh, 1928
 Cathedral of Learning, Pittsburgh, 1937
 Conroy Education Center, Pittsburgh, 1895
 EQT Plaza, Downtown Pittsburgh, Pittsburgh, 1984
 Fulton Elementary School, Highland Park, Pittsburgh, 1894 and 1929
 Grant Building, Downtown Pittsburgh, Pittsburgh, 1929
 Gulf Tower, Downtown Pittsburgh, Pittsburgh, 1932
 Highland Towers Apartments, Shadyside, Pittsburgh, 1913
 Knoxville Junior High School, Knoxville, Pittsburgh, 1927
 Koppers Building, Pittsburgh, 1929
 Larimer School, Larimer, Pittsburgh, 1896 and 1931
 Lemington Elementary School, Pittsburgh, 1937
 Letsche Elementary School, Pittsburgh, 1905
 Lincoln Elementary School, Larimer, Pittsburgh, 1931
 Madison Elementary School, Upper Hill, Pittsburgh, 1902 and 1929
 Medical Arts Building, University of Pittsburgh Medical Center, Pittsburgh, 1931
 Mifflin Elementary School, Pittsburgh, 1932
 New Granada Theater, Hill District, Pittsburgh, 1928
 Oliver High School, Pittsburgh, 1925
 Omni William Penn Hotel, Downtown Pittsburgh, Pittsburgh, 1916 and 1929
 Prospect Junior High and Elementary School, Mount Washington, Pittsburgh, 1931
 Salk Hall, University of Pittsburgh, Pittsburgh, 1941
 Schiller Elementary School, East Allegheny, Pittsburgh, 1939
 Thaddeus Stevens Elementary School, Elliott, Pittsburgh, 1939
 Washington Education Center, Pittsburgh, 1936
 Western Psychiatric Institute and Clinic, Pittsburgh, 1938–1940
 Whitehill-Gleason Motors, East Liberty, Pittsburgh, 1920

Reading 
 Astor Theater, Reading, 1928
 Berks County Courthouse, Reading, 1932
 Hotel Abraham Lincoln, Reading, 1930

York 
 Mt. Rose School, York
 Valencia Ballroom, York, 1930s
 York Hospital, York
 York Telephone and Telegraph Building, York

Other cities 
 1419 Darby Road, Havertown, 1945
 Allegheny County Airport, West Mifflin, 1931
 Allen Theatre, Annville
 Altoona Armory, Logan Township, 1938
 Alvina Krause Theatre (former Columbia Theatre), Bloomsburg, 1940
 Anthony Wayne Theatre, Wayne, 1928
 Arcadia Theatre, Wellsboro, 1921
 Berwick Theatre, Berwick, 1926
 Bethlehem Armory, Bethlehem, 1930
 Bradfords Main Street Movie House, Bradford, 1935
 Butler Armory, Butler, 1922, 1930
 Campus Theatre, Lewisburg Historic District, Lewisburg, 1941
 Carlisle Theatre, Carlisle, 1939
 Clearfield Armory, Lawrence Township, 1938
 Coraopolis Armory, Coraopolis, 1938
 County Cinema, Doylestown Historic District, Doylestown, 1938
 Dime Savings and Trust Company, Allentown, 1925
 Easton National Bank, Easton Historic District, Eaton Township, 1929
 F M. Kirby Center, Wilkes-Barre, 1938
 Farmers National Bank, Bloomsburg, 1941
 First National Bank of Leechburg, Leechburg, late 1920s
 Gettysburg Armory, Gettysburg, 1938
 Hamburg Armory, Hamburg, 1939
 Hiway Theatre, Jenkintown, 1925
 Huntingdon Armory, Huntingdon, 1930 and 1937
 Jacob Mayer Building, Easton Historic District, Easton, 1930s
 Kane Armory, Kane, 1922
 Latrobe Armory, Latrobe, 1928
 Leader Building, Jacobus
 Lewisburg Armory, East Buffalo Township, 1938
 Ligonier Armory, Ligonier, 1938
 Montgomery Ward Building, Lewiston, 1929
 Moose Lodge, Williamsport, 1940
 Mount St. Peter Church, New Kensington, 1942
 The Movies (former Sauconia Theatre), Hellertown, 1940 and 1968
 N. N. Moss Building, Greenville, 1920
 New Castle Armory, Shenango Township, 1938
 Nineteenth Street Theater, Allentown, 1928
 Paxton Municipal Building, Harrisburg, 1930s
 Pennsylvania Farm Show Complex & Expo Center, Harrisburg, 1931
 Roxy Theatre (former Dreamland Theatre), Lock Haven, 1924 and 1931
 Royer Pharmacy, Ephrata, 1938
 Scottdale Armory, Scottdale, 1929
 Strawbridge & Clothier, Jenkinton, 1931 and 1954
 Union National Bank of Mahanoy City, Mahanoy City, 1922
 Warner Theater, West Chester, 1930
 Waynesboro Armory, Waynesboro, 1938
 Wellsboro Armory, Wellsboro, 1932
 William J. Nealon Federal Building and United States Courthouse, Scranton, 1931
 Williamsport Armory, Williamsport, 1927

See also 
 List of Art Deco architecture
 List of Art Deco architecture in the United States

References 

 "Art Deco & Streamline Moderne Buildings." Roadside Architecture.com. Retrieved 2019-01-03.
 Cinema Treasures. Retrieved 2022-09-06
 "Court House Lover". Flickr. Retrieved 2022-09-06
 Fanning, Colin. "Art Deco" Encyclopedia of Greater Philadelphia.  Retrieved 2019-01-03.
 "New Deal Map". The Living New Deal. Retrieved 2020-12-25.
 "SAH Archipedia". Society of Architectural Historians. Retrieved 2021-11-21.

External links 
 

 
Art Deco
Art Deco architecture in Pennsylvania
Pennsylvania-related lists